Laws of football  may refer to:

 Laws of rugby league
 Laws of rugby union
 Laws of the Game (association football)
 Laws of Australian rules football
 American football rules